Bill Lane may refer to:

Bill Lane (baseball), American baseball player
Bill Lane (basketball) (1916–1997), American basketball player
Bill Lane (ornithologist) (1922–2000), Australian amateur ornithologist
Bill Lane (publisher) (1919–2010), American publisher and diplomat

See also
William Lane (disambiguation)